Gary Divorty (born 28 January 1966) is an English former professional rugby league footballer who played in the 1980s and 1990s.

Background
Gary Divorty was born on 28 January 1966. His father, Robin, was an amateur rugby league coach. He started his junior rugby league career with Heworth before turning professional in 1983, signing for Hull.

Playing career

Hull
Divorty played , in Hull FC's 29-12 victory over Hull Kingston Rovers in the 1984 Yorkshire Cup Final during the 1984–85 season at Boothferry Park, Kingston upon Hull, on Saturday 27 October 1984, and played  in Hull FC's 0-12 defeat by Hull Kingston Rovers in the 1984–85 John Player Special Trophy Final at Boothferry Park, Kingston upon Hull on Saturday 26 January 1985. He also appeared as a substitute, and scored a try in Hull FC's 24-28 defeat by Wigan in the 1985 Challenge Cup Final at Wembley Stadium, London on Saturday 4 May 1985, in front of a crowd of 99,801, in what is regarded as the most marvellous cup final in living memory, which Hull narrowly lost after fighting back from 12-28 down at half-time.

Divorty was a substitute in Hull FC's 24-31 defeat by Castleford in the 1986 Yorkshire County Cup Final during the 1986–87 season at Headingley Rugby Stadium, Leeds, on Saturday 11 October 1986.

Leeds
Divorty signed for Leeds in 1989. The transfer fee was set at £120,000 by a tribunal after Hull and Leeds failed to reach an agreement.

Halifax
In August 1992, Divorty and Leeds teammate John Bentley were signed by Halifax for a combined fee of £100,000. Divorty played for three seasons at Halifax before returning to his original club, Hull, in 1995.

International honours
Gary Divorty won caps for Great Britain while at Hull in 1985 against France (2 matches).

Personal life
Gary Divorty is the father of the rugby league footballer, Ross Divorty.

References

External links
Maurice Bamford column

1966 births
Living people
English rugby league players
Gold Coast Chargers players
Great Britain national rugby league team players
Halifax R.L.F.C. players
Hull F.C. players
Leeds Rhinos players
People from Howden
Rugby league locks
Rugby league second-rows
Wakefield Trinity players